Nectarios Triantis (born 11 May 2003), is an Australian professional footballer who plays as a defender for the Central Coast Mariners.

References

External links

Living people
2003 births
Australian soccer players
Association football defenders
Sydney Olympic FC players
Sydney FC players
Western Sydney Wanderers FC players
Central Coast Mariners FC players
A-League Men players
National Premier Leagues players
Australian people of Greek descent